Federico Mannini (born 18 April 1992) is an Italian footballer, who plays as a defender.

A member of 2009 FIFA U-17 World Cup, Mannini made his competitive debut in 2011–12 Coppa Italia.

Club career

Siena and loans
Born in Siena, Tuscany, Mannini started his career at Siena. In January 2011 he was signed by Internazionale along with national team team-mate Francesco Bardi (from Livorno), rejoining defenders Simone Benedetti and Felice Natalino, all of 2009 FIFA U-17 World Cup. However, he failed to play regularly in the Primavera under-20 team, in which the usual left-back was Cristiano Biraghi.

In June Inter did not exercise the option to sign him in the definitive deal, in July he left for newly relegated team Triestina. He made his debut against Novara in 2011–12 Coppa Italia, losing 0–4.

In 2012, he was signed by San Marino Calcio. On 29 August 2013 he left for Cosenza.

International career
Mannini started his international career with the Italy U-18 team in 2009–10 season. Despite not playing for Azzurrini in 2008–09 U-17 Euro final round, he was selected to 2009 FIFA U-17 World Cup (which was the extension of 2008–09 U-17 season) and played his first U-17 game in round 2, replacing centre-back Vincenzo Camilleri at half-time. He was also started the next two games, partnering with Michele Camporese, winning United States in the round of 16. However, he also cautioned for the second time, suspended for the quarter-finals. Azzurrini finished as the losing quarter-finalists. Despite a regular U-18 team (which he played in the 2010 Slovakia youth Cup), the feeder team of U-19, he was picked by U-19 coach Daniele Zoratto only twice in friendlies, although received some call-up since August 2010. He started the first one and as a substitute for Emanuele Suagher in the second one.

Honours
Inter Primavera
 Torneo di Viareggio: 2011

References

External links
 
 FIGC 
 Triestina Profile 

Italian footballers
A.C.N. Siena 1904 players
Inter Milan players
U.S. Triestina Calcio 1918 players
A.S.D. Victor San Marino players
Cosenza Calcio players
Serie C players
Association football defenders
Sportspeople from Siena
1992 births
Living people
Footballers from Tuscany